= Ulugbekhon Maksumov =

Uzbek-born businessman, founder and CEO of Aksum Group

Ulugkhon Maksumov
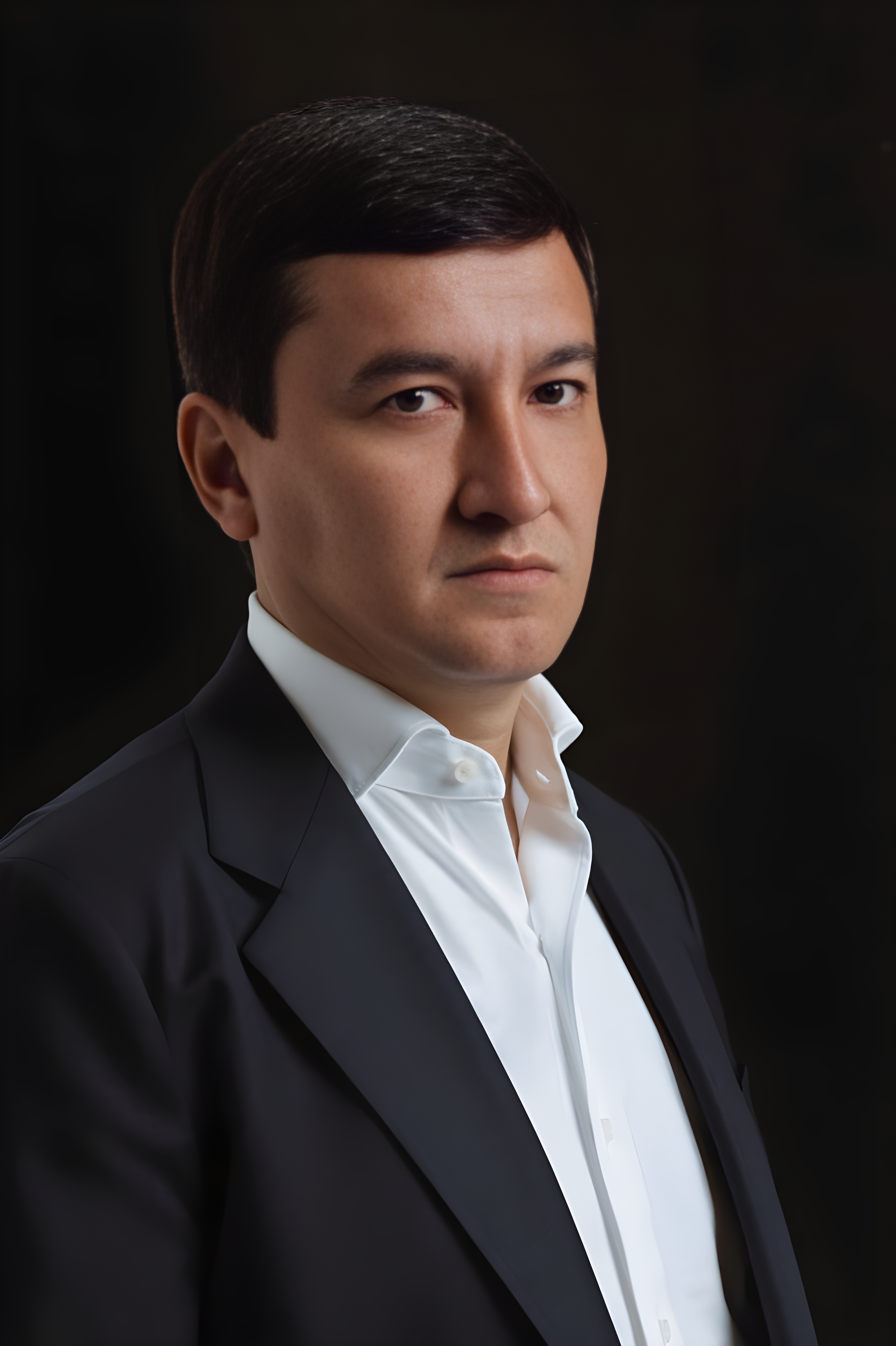
- Born: September 9, 1979 (age 47); Uzbekistan
- Education: Fergana State University (MA, Philology)
- Occupations: Businessman, entrepreneur
- Years active: 2000s–present
- Organization: Aksum Group
- Known for: Founder and CEO of Aksum Group
- Title: Chief Executive Officer
- Parent(s): Yusupkhon Maksumov, Dilbarkhon Maksumova

Ulugbekhon Maksumov is an Uzbek-born businessman and entrepreneur best known as the founder and chief executive of Aksum Group, a conglomerate with subsidiaries in the defence, armoured-vehicle and marine industries. His companies operate principally in the United Arab Emirates and Uzbekistan and market armoured vehicles, special-purpose boats and related products to government, law-enforcement and private clients.

== Early life and education ==
Ulugbekhon Maksumov was born on September 9, 1979, to Dilbarkhon Maksumova and Yusupkhon Maksumov. Maksumov graduated in 2001 from The Fergana State University with a master's degree in philology.

== Career ==
Maksumov began his career in the automotive sector in Uzbekistan, focusing on vehicle manufacturing and industrial management. In the mid-2000s, he relocated to Dubai, United Arab Emirates, to pursue new business opportunities in the automotive and defence sectors. In UAE, Maksumov expanded his activities in the defence sector, supplying both governmental and non-governmental clients in the Middle East and Eastern Europe.

In 2015, Maksumov sponsored The Ramadan Football Championship.

=== Aksum Group ===
In 2019, he founded Aksum Marine in the United Arab Emirates as part of a broader expansion of businesses under the Aksum brand across multiple sectors, including marine and armored vehicle production. Maksumov established Aksum Marine VPK and Aksum VPK in Uzbekistan in 2021, focusing respectively on the production of armoured boats and land-based military vehicles. The Aksum Marine VPK facility in Uzbekistan manufactures armoured and high-speed patrol boats, including models with engines up to 750 horsepower capable of amphibious operations, as demonstrated at the 2024 MSITF defense exhibition in Tashkent. In addition to his business activities, Maksumov was appointed as a member of the Central Election Commission of Uzbekistan responsible for overseeing electoral processes for Uzbek citizens residing in Dubai.

In May 2024, Aksum Group opened Aksum Armored Vehicles LLC, a new factory in Dubai intended to expand armoured-vehicle production.

As of 2025, Ulugbekhon Maksumov is the chief executive officer (CEO) of Aksum Group. His company operates in the defence and specialized manufacturing sectors with operations in the United Arab Emirates and Uzbekistan. Aksum Group's activities focus on providing high-security and transportation technologies on land and sea. The group comprises five specialized subsidiaries: Aksum Armored Vehicles, Aksum Marine, Aksum VPK, Aksum Marine VPK, and Aksum Glass. The group's product range includes armoured and tactical vehicles, high-speed and special-purpose armoured boats, and ballistic glass equipment. These products are marketed for use by government agencies, law enforcement, private security organizations, NGOs, and individual clients. Aksum Group has entered the European defence market by participating in Eurosatory 2026, the most important international trade fair in the sector, held in Paris.
